The Mannheim University of Applied Sciences is a public higher education institute located in Mannheim, Germany. Referred to as Hochschule Mannheim in German and previously known as Fachhochschule Mannheim, it offers degree programs at bachelor's and master's level in the fields of engineering, informatics, biotechnology, design, and social affairs.

History
The Mannheim University of Applied Sciences was founded in 1898 as a private school of engineering for the disciplines of mechanical and electronical engineering, subsidized by the city of Mannheim. In 1939, it was taken over by the city and named Mannheim School of Engineering. In 1969 finally, it was taken over again by the State of Baden-Württemberg and renamed State School of Engineering. As a consequence, the curriculum was broadened by adding, among others, the subjects chemical engineering, process engineering, and informatics. In 1971, the School of Engineering was officially promoted to the status of a University of Applied Sciences.

In 1995, the City College of Design was integrated into the university as the Faculty of Design, comprising institutes for interactive media, print media, time based media, photography, and design sciences. When the Mannheim School of Social Affairs joined the university in a merger in 2006, the university was renamed to Hochschule Mannheim. The university was one of the first German universities of applied sciences offering a degree program in biotechnology.

Faculties
The university has the following faculties:
 Faculty of Biotechnology
 Faculty of Electronic Engineering
 Faculty of Design
 Faculty of Informatics
 Faculty of Information Technology
 Faculty of Mechanical Engineering
 Faculty of Process Engineering and Chemical Engineering
 Faculty of Engineering Management
 Faculty of Social Affairs

See also
 List of universities in Germany
 Rhine Neckar Metropolitan Area

References

External links 
 Mannheim University of Applied Sciences
 Graduate School Rhein-Neckar
 Mannheim Center of Excellence in Tribology

Mannheim
Universities of Applied Sciences in Germany
Universities and colleges in Baden-Württemberg
Technical universities and colleges in Germany
Educational institutions established in 1898
1898 establishments in Germany